Apamea boopis is a moth of the  family Noctuidae.

Apamea (moth)
Moths described in 1908
Taxa named by George Hampson